Memories of a Time to Come is a compilation album by Blind Guardian. It was released on 20 January 2012. With the exception of "Sacred Worlds", all songs on the first two discs have been remixed, while "Valhalla", "The Bard's Song (In the Forest)", "The Bard's Song (The Hobbit)" and "And Then There Was Silence" have been re-recorded. The third disc, which is included only in deluxe limited edition, contains various demo recordings.

Track listing

References

2012 compilation albums
Blind Guardian albums